Buccleuch may refer to:


Places

Australia
 Buccleuch County, an administrative division in New South Wales, Australia
 Buccleuch, South Australia, a small locality and railway station
 County of Buccleuch, an administrative division in South Australia

Other countries
 Buccleuch (parish), a district of South Edinburgh, Scotland
 Buccleuch, Gauteng, a suburb of Sandton, South Africa
 Buccleuch, Scottish Borders, a village in Scotland

Other uses
 Duke of Buccleuch, a title in the Peerage of Scotland

See also
 Buccleuch Mansion, a historic house museum within Buccleuch Park in New Brunswick, New Jersey